Bakovićka Citonja is a village in the municipality of Fojnica, Bosnia and Herzegovina.

Demographics 
According to the 2013 census, its population was 38, all Croats.

References

Populated places in Fojnica